La Vertiente Airport ,  was a public use airport located near Chillán, Bío Bío, Chile.

Google Earth Historical Imagery (2/10/2012) shows a  grass runway. The (2/12/2013) imagery shows a pivot irrigation system installed and the central portion of the runway under cultivation. Current (12/7/2017) has the section plowed and cultivated.

See also

Transport in Chile
List of airports in Chile

References

External links 
OurAirports - La Vertiente
OpenStreetMap - La Vertiente airstrip

Defunct airports
Airports in Ñuble Region